Aage Haugland (1 February 1944 – 23 December 2000) was a Danish operatic bass.

Life and career 

Haugland was born in Copenhagen and made his professional debut in Oslo in 1968. From 1970 to 1973 he was based in Bremen, and appeared at Den Jyske Opera in Aarhus in 1972. In 1973 he became a member of the Royal Danish Opera, where in 1985 he was made a Kammersanger.

His engagements outside Denmark included roles at La Scala, Milan, The Metropolitan Opera, New York City,  the Royal Opera House, Covent Garden, the Bayreuth and Salzburg Festivals, the Opéra National de Paris and the Bavarian State Opera in Munich.

In 1989 he was honoured as "Person of the Year" by the Danish-American Society of New York.

He died of cancer in Lillerød, Denmark.

Roles 

His operatic roles included Fasolt, Hunding and Hagen in Der Ring des Nibelungen, Varlaam, Pimen and Boris in Boris Godunov, King Marke in Tristan und Isolde, Klingsor in Parsifal, Prince Ivan Khovansky in Khovanshchina and the Doktor in Wozzeck.  In 2000, he played the role of the Commander in the première of Poul Ruders' The Handmaid's Tale.  Baron Ochs in Der Rosenkavalier was perhaps his most famous role.

Non-operatic work 

In 1994 Haugland premièred the role of Atlas in the musical Atlantis by Østre Gasværk.  
He also appeared in two Danish films, Sirup and Flamberede hjerter.

He also performed and recorded Mussorgsky's Songs and Dances of Death, and lieder by Ibert, Kilpinen, and other composers.

Recordings 
Richard Wagner:  The Twilight of the Gods, conductor Reginald Goodall (Chandos CHAN 3060(5))

Modest Mussorgsky: Khovanshchina, conductor Claudio Abbado (CD: Deutsche Grammophon,
Cat:429 758-2)

Modest Mussorgsky: Mussorgsky Complete Songs (CHANDOS DIGITAL, CHAN 9336-8.)  Includes the Songs and Dances of Death.

Carl August Nielsen: Saul og David, 0p. 25 conductor Neeme Järvi (Chandos CHAN 9811/12), The Danish National Radio Symphony Orchestra, 1990

Igor Stravinsky: The Soldier's Tale, conductor Neeme Järvi (Chandos CHAN 9189), Royal Scottish National Orchestra, 1993

Dmitri Shostakovich: Lady Macbeth of the Mtsensk District, Bastille Orchestra, conductor Myung-Whun Chung, (Deutsche Grammophon, ASIN: B000001GI1)

Video 
Richard Strauss: Der Rosenkavalier, conductor Georg Solti, with Kiri te Kanawa and Barbara Bonney.

Alban Berg: Wozzeck.  Haugland plays the Doktor.  Conductor Claudio Abbado, with Franz Grundheber, Hildegard Behrens and Heinz Zednik.

External links 

 Haugland playing Doktor.   YouTube.
 Baron Ochs in DER ROSENKAVALIER

1944 births
2000 deaths
20th-century Danish male opera singers
Operatic basses
Musicians from Copenhagen
Deaths from cancer in Denmark